The KPÖ Plus, also stylized as "KPÖ+", is an electoral alliance between the Communist Party of Austria and the . The alliance was formed in May 2017, after the Young Greens were expelled from The Greens. The alliance focuses on issues such as affordable housing and a better living standard for all Austrians.

Election results

Parliament (Parlament)

External links
Website  

2015 establishments in Austria
Communist parties in Austria
Communist Party of Austria
Direct democracy parties
Eurosceptic parties in Austria
Left-wing political party alliances
Political parties established in 2015
Political party alliances in Austria